Royce "Snoop" Johnson is an American basketball coach who is currently the interim head coach of the UT Arlington Mavericks men's basketball team.

Playing career
Johnson played 1 year at North Texas in the 1992–1993 season. He played in 11 games averaging 0.6 points, 0.7 points, and 1.3 assists.

Coaching career
in 1995 Johnson became an assistant coach at Kimbal High School under his dad. In 1998 he was made the head coach of Kimbal High School. He was the head coach for 16 years and compiled a record of 373-76 he also lead the team to 3 state champonships. On June 8, 2014, Johnson was fired. In 2018 Johnson was hired as an assistant coach. In 2021 he was promoted to associate head coach. On February 11, 2023, after Greg Young was fired Johnson was named the interim head coach.

References 

Living people
High school basketball coaches in Texas
North Texas Mean Green men's basketball players
American men's basketball coaches
UT Arlington Mavericks men's basketball coaches
Basketball coaches from Texas
Basketball players from Texas